Winifred Geraldine Ramsey Beamish (née Ramsey; 23 June 1883 – 10 May 1972) was an English tennis player who competed in the 1920 Summer Olympics.

Biography 

Winifred Geraldine Ramsey was born on 23 June 1883 at Forest Gate, London. She married tennis player Alfred Beamish on 30 September 1911.

She competed at The Championships, Wimbledon from 1910 throughout 1933 in each year the tournament was held, reaching the semifinals three times in 1919, 1922 and 1923. In 1919 she lost to Phyllis Satterthwaite, in 1922, she lost to Molla Mallory and the following year to Suzanne Lenglen.

In 1920 she won the silver medal in the Olympics doubles competition with her partner Dorothy Holman. She also competed in the mixed doubles event with her husband Alfred, but they were eliminated in the second round. In the singles competition she had a walkover in the first round and was eliminated in the second round by her doubles partner Dorothy Holman.

One of her greatest triumphs was her title at the World Covered Court Championship (WCCC) in 1920 where she defeated Kathleen McKane Godfree in the final in three sets. Along with McKane Godfree she won the WCCC doubles title in 1919, 1920 and 1923.

She died on 10 May 1972 at St Pancras, London.

Grand Slam finals

Doubles (1 runner-up)

World championships finals

Singles (1 title)

Doubles (4 titles, 1 runner-up)

Mixed doubles (1 title)

References

External links
 

1883 births
1972 deaths
English female tennis players
French Championships (tennis) champions
Olympic silver medallists for Great Britain
Olympic tennis players of Great Britain
Tennis players at the 1920 Summer Olympics
Olympic medalists in tennis
Medalists at the 1920 Summer Olympics
Tennis people from Greater London
British female tennis players